Oakland Bay is a tidal estuarial body of water near the town of Shelton, Washington.  It is connected to the larger Puget Sound via Hammersley Inlet.  The community of Bay Shore, Washington was located on Oakland Bay.  The major freshwater inlet is Goldsborough Creek, which runs through the town of Shelton.

References
 Findlay, Jean Cammon, and Paterson, Robin, Mosquito Fleet of South Puget Sound, Arcadia Publishing (2008) .

Bays of Washington (state)
Bodies of water of Mason County, Washington
Landforms of Puget Sound